Cooch Behar district is a district of Indian state of West Bengal.

Formerly part of the Kamarupa kingdom, the area became the heart of the Kamata Kingdom in the 12th century. During the British Raj, the district was known as Cooch Behar state ruled by the Koch dynasty until 1947, when it became part of India.

The district consists of the flat plains of North Bengal and has several rivers: the most notable being the Teesta, Jaldhaka and Torsa. The district has the highest proportion of Scheduled Castes in the country, where they form a majority.

Etymology

The name Cooch Behar is derived from two words—Cooch, a corrupted form of the word Koch, the name of the Koch tribes, and the word behar is derived from vihara meaning land, Koch Behar means land of the Koches.

History

Early period

 

Cooch Behar formed part of the Kamarupa Kingdom of Assam from the 4th to the 12th centuries. In the 12th century, the area became a part of the Kamata Kingdom, first ruled by the Khen dynasty from their capital at Kamatapur. The Khens were an indigenous tribe, and they ruled till about 1498 CE, when they fell to Alauddin Hussain Shah, the independent Pathan Sultan of Gour. The new invaders fought with the local Bhuyan chieftains and the Ahom king Suhungmung and lost control of the region. During this time, the Koch tribe became very powerful and proclaimed itself Kamateshwar (Lord of Kamata) and established the Koch dynasty.

The first important Koch ruler was Biswa Singha, who came to power in 1515. Under his son, Nara Narayan, the Kamata Kingdom reached its zenith. Nara Narayan's younger brother, Shukladhwaj (Chilarai), was a noted military general who undertook expeditions to expand the kingdom. He became governor of its eastern portion.

After Chilarai's death, his son Raghudev became governor of this portion. Since Nara Narayan did not have a son, Raghudev was seen as the heir apparent. However, a late child of Nara Narayan removed Raghudev's claim to the throne. To placate him, Nara Narayan had to anoint Raghudev as a vassal chief of the portion of the kingdom east of the Sankosh river. This area came to be known as Koch Hajo. After the death of Nara Narayan in 1584, Raghudev declared independence. The kingdom ruled by the son of Nara Narayan, Lakshmi Narayan, came to be known as Cooch Behar. The division of the Kamata Kingdom into Koch Behar and Koch Hajo was permanent. Koch Behar aligned itself with the Mughal Empire and finally joined the India as a part of the West Bengal, whereas remnants of the Koch Hajo rulers aligned themselves with the Ahom kingdom and the region became a part of Assam.

As the early capital of the Koch Kingdom, Cooch Behar's location was not static and became stable only when shifted to Cooch Behar town. Maharaja Rup Narayan, on the advice of an unknown saint, transferred the capital from Attharokotha to Guriahati (now called Cooch Behar town) on the banks of the Torsa river between 1693 and 1714. After this, the capital was always in or near its present location.

In 1661 CE, Maharaja Pran Narayan planned to expand his kingdom. However, Mir Jumla, the subedar of Bengal under the Mughal emperor Aurangazeb, attacked Cooch Behar and conquered the territory, meeting almost no resistance. The town of Cooch Behar was subsequently named Alamgirnagar. Maharaja Pran Narayan regained his kingdom within a few days.

British Raj

In 1772–1773, the king of Bhutan attacked and captured Cooch Behar. To expel the Bhutanese, the kingdom of Cooch Behar signed a defence treaty with the British East India Company on 5 April 1773. After expelling the Bhutanese, Cooch Behar became a princely kingdom under the protection of British East India company.

The Victor Jubilee Palace was based on Buckingham Palace and built in 1887, during the reign of Maharaja Nripendra Narayan. In 1878, the maharaja married the daughter of Brahmo preacher Keshab Chandra Sen. This union led to a renaissance in Cooch Behar state. Maharaja Nripendra Narayan is known as the architect of modern Cooch Behar town.

Post Independence
Under an agreement between the kings of Cooch Behar and the Indian Government at the end of British rule, Maharaja Jagaddipendra Narayan transferred full authority, jurisdiction and power of the state to the Dominion Government of India, effective 12 September 1949.  Eventually, Cooch Bihar became part of the state of West Bengal on 19 January 1950, with Cooch Behar town as its headquarters.

A geopolitical curiosity was that there were 92 Bangladeshi exclaves, with a total area of 47.7 km2 in Cooch-Behar. Similarly, there were 106 Indian exclaves inside Bangladesh, with a total area of 69.5 km2. These were part of the high stake card or chess games centuries ago between two regional kings, the Raja of Cooch Behar and the Maharaja of Rangpur.

Twenty-one of the Bangladeshi exclaves were within Indian exclaves, and three of the Indian exclaves were within Bangladeshi exclaves. The largest Indian exclave was Balapara Khagrabari which surrounded a Bangladeshi exclave, Upanchowki Bhajni, which itself surrounded an Indian exclave called Dahala Khagrabari, of less than one hectare (link to external map here ). But all this has ended in the historic India-Bangladesh land agreement. See Indo-Bangladesh enclaves.

Geography

Cooch Behar is a district under the Jalpaiguri Division of the state of West Bengal. Cooch Behar is located in the northeastern part of the state and bounded by the district of Jalpaiguri and Alipurduar in the north, Dhubri and Kokrajhar district of Assam in the east and by Bangladesh in the west as well as in the south. The district forms part of the Himalayan Terai of West Bengal.

A geopolitical curiosity was that there were 92 Bangladeshi exclaves, with a total area of 47.7 km2 in Cooch-Behar. Similarly, there were 106 Indian exclaves inside Bangladesh, with a total area of 69.5 km2. These were part of the high stake card or chess games centuries ago between two regional kings, the Raja of Cooch Behar and the Maharaja of Rangpur.

Twenty-one of the Bangladeshi exclaves were within Indian exclaves, and three of the Indian exclaves were within Bangladeshi exclaves. The largest Indian exclave was Balapara Khagrabari which surrounded a Bangladeshi exclave, Upanchowki Bhajni, which itself surrounded an Indian exclave called Dahala Khagrabari, of less than one hectare (link to external map here ). But all this has ended in the historic India-Bangladesh land agreement. See Indo-Bangladesh enclaves.

Rivers and topography
Cooch Behar is a flat region with a slight southeastern slope along which the main rivers of the district flow. Most of the highland areas are in the Sitalkuchi region and most of the low-lying lands lie in Dinhata region.

The rivers in the district of Cooch Behar generally flow from northwest to southeast. Six rivers that cut through the district are the Teesta, Jaldhaka, Torsha, Kaljani, Raidak, Gadadhar and Ghargharia.

Flora and fauna
It shares the park with Alipurduar district.

Demographics

According to the 2011 census Cooch Behar district has a population of 2,819,086, roughly equal to the nation of Jamaica. This gives it a ranking of 136th in India (out of a total of 739). Its population growth rate over the decade 2001–2011 was  13.86%. Koch Bihar has a sex ratio of 942 females for every 1000 males, and a literacy rate of 75.49%. Scheduled Castes and Scheduled Tribes make up 1,414,336 (50.17%) and 18,125 (0.64%) of the population respectively. Cooch Behar is the only district in India where Scheduled Castes make up a majority of the population.

Religion

Hinduism is the majority religion. Islam is the minority religion, and is mainly rural. Muslims are a significant minority in Dinhata I (36.98%), Dinhata II (36.68%) and Sitalkuchi (35.31%) blocks.

Language

At the time of the 2011 census, 94.79% of the population spoke Bengali, 1.31% Rajbongshi and 1.17% Hindi as their first language.

Government and politics

Divisions

Sub-divisions
The district of Cooch Behar comprises five sub-divisions: 
 Cooch Behar Sadar subdivision
 Dinhata subdivision
 Mathabhanga subdivision
 Tufanganj subdivision
 Mekhliganj subdivision

Assembly constituencies
As per order of the 2008 Delimitation Commission in respect of the delimitation of constituencies in the West Bengal, the district is divided into 9 assembly constituencies:

Mekliganj, Mathabhanga, Cooch Behar Uttar, Sitalkuchi and Sitai constituencies are reserved for Scheduled Castes (SC) candidates. Mekhliganj constituency is part of Jalpaiguri (Lok Sabha constituency), which also contains six assembly segments from Jalpaiguri district. Mathabhanga, Cooch Behar Uttar, Cooch Behar Dakshin, Sitalkuchi, Sitai, Dinhata and Natabari constituencies will continue to form the Cooch Behar (Lok Sabha constituency), which is reserved for Scheduled Castes (SC). Tufanganj constituency is part of Alipurduars (Lok Sabha constituency), which also contains six assembly segments from Alipurduar and Jalpaiguri districts.

Education

Baramaricha Delwar Hossain (X+2) High School
Suniti Academy

Towns and villages
 

Bhetaguri

See also
 Indo-Bangladesh enclaves
 List of enclaves and exclaves
 List of West Bengal districts ranked by literacy rate

References

Further reading
 Moore, Lucy (2004) Maharanis: The Extraordinary Tale Of Four Indian Queens And Their Journey From Purdah To Parliament, Penguin,

External links

 Website of the district of Cooch Behar
 Crime Report
 Link to external map

 
Districts of West Bengal
Minority Concentrated Districts in India
Proposed states and union territories of India

sv:Kutch Behar